Upernaviarsuk is an agricultural settlement in Kujalleq, Greenland.

Notable Person
 Vivian Motzfeldt

Sources
Nunalerineq.gl
Sagalands.com: Upernaviarsuk
Mindat.org
Maps.arcgis.com, confirmed by Oqaasileriffik, prepared by  Asiaq
Nomination to UNESCO´s World Heritage List – Kujataa – a subarctic farming landscape in Greenland (.pdf)
Kujataa.gl: Det moderne landbrugs historie
Upernaviarsuk in Den Store Danske
Bank.stat.gl: population of Upernaviarsuk 1977–2020

Kujalleq